Splendrillia gratiosa is a species of sea snail, a marine gastropod mollusk in the family Drilliidae.

Description
The length of the shell attains 17.5 mm, its diameter 6 mm.

This is a smooth shell, pink, with longitudinal red flames. tTe spire is acutely elongate, but the apex is blunt and papillary. The shell contains 9 slightly convex whorls. The suture is impressed. The body whorl is very short and slightly inflated. The aperture is ovate. The columella is sinuate. The outer lip is sharp.

Distribution
This marine species is endemic to Australia and occurs off South Australia.

References

 Cotton, B.C. 1959. South Australian Mollusca. Archaeogastropoda. Handbook of the Flora and Fauna of South Australia. Adelaide : South Australian Government Printer 449 pp.
 Wells, F.E. 1990. Revision of the recent Australian Turridae referred to the genera Splendrillia and Austrodrillia. Journal of the Malacological Society of Australasia 11: 73–117
 Wells F. (1991) A new species of Splendrillia, with comments on two other species of the genus (Gastropoda: Turridae). Journal of the Malacological Society of Australia 12: 63–67

External links
  Tucker, J.K. 2004 Catalog of recent and fossil turrids (Mollusca: Gastropoda). Zootaxa 682:1–1295.
  Petit, R. E. (2009). George Brettingham Sowerby, I, II & III: their conchological publications and molluscan taxa. Zootaxa. 2189: 1–218

gratiosa
Gastropods of Australia
Gastropods described in 1896